The 2000 Saskatchewan Scott Tournament of Hearts women's provincial curling championship, was held January 26–30 at the Humboldt Uniplex in Humboldt, Saskatchewan. The winning team of June Campbell, represented Saskatchewan at the 2000 Scott Tournament of Hearts in Prince George, British Columbia, where the team finished round robin with an 8-3 record, before losing the 3-4 game to British Columbia's Kelley Law.

Teams

Standings

Results

Draw 1
January 26, 7:30 PM CT

Draw 2
January 27, 9:30 AM CT

Draw 3
January 27, 2:00 PM CT

Draw 4
January 28, 9:30 AM CT

Draw 5
January 28, 2:00 PM CT

Draw 6
January 28, 7:00 PM CT

Draw 7
January 29, 9:30 PM CT

Playoffs

Semifinal
January 29, 7:00 PM CT

Final
January 30, 2:00 PM CT

References

Saskatchewan Scotties Tournament Of Hearts, 2000
Humboldt, Saskatchewan
Scotties Tournament of Hearts provincial tournaments
Curling in Saskatchewan
2000 in women's curling
Women in Saskatchewan